Lemmon or Lemmons can refer to:

People
Chris Lemmon (born 1954), United States film actor and author
Dal Millington Lemmon (1887–1958), United States federal judge
Dan Lemmon (fl. 1990s–2010s), New Zealand visual effects supervisor
G. E. Lemmon (f. 1900s), United States cattle rancher (George Edward Lemmon)
Gayle Tzemach Lemmon (born 1973), author of two New York Times best sellers
George Lemmon (born 1932), seventh Bishop of Fredericton
Harry T. Lemmon (born 1930), Justice of the Louisiana Supreme Court
John Gill Lemmon (1831–1908), American botanist
Jack Lemmon (1925–2001), United States film actor
John Lemmon (1930–1966), English logician and philosopher
John Lemmon (politician) (1875–1955), long serving MLA in Victoria, Australia
Jon Lemmon (born 1984), United States athlete in soccer
Kasi Lemmons (born 1961), United States film director and actress
LaMar Lemmons Jr. (f. 2000s), United States businessman and political figure in Michigan
Mark Lemmon (1889–1975) was an American architect
Mark A. Lemmon (born 1964), English-born biochemist
Mary Ann Vial Lemmon (born 1941), United States federal judge
Nelson Lemmon (1908–1989), Australian politician son of John Lemmon
Robert Stell Lemmon (1885–1964), American writer and naturalist
Sara Plummer Lemmon (1836–1923), American botanist and illustrator
Scott R. Lemmon (born 1968), United States software programmer, author of the Proxomitron web-filtering software
Willard Lemmon (1924–2012), American politician

Places
Lemmon, South Dakota, a small city
Lemmon Township, Adams County, North Dakota, a defunct township
Lemmon Valley, Nevada, a census-designated place
Mount Lemmon, a mountain in Arizona
North Lemmon Township, Adams County, North Dakota, a defunct township
Lemmons, the home in north London of Kingsley Amis and his family, 1968–1976
Lemmon House (disambiguation), various houses

Other uses
Lemmon v. New York, an 1852 New York Superior Court case that freed slaves who were brought into New York State
Lemmon (drug), street name of the sedative methaqualone, derived from the producer Lemmon Company of Sellersville

See also
 271P/van Houten–Lemmon, a short-period comet discovered in 1966
 C/2018 C2 (Lemmon), a hyperbolic comet first observed in 2018
 Lemon (disambiguation)
 Lemon (surname)